Bulbothrix johannis is a species of corticolous (bark-dwelling), foliose lichen in the family Parmeliaceae. Found on Réunion, it was formally described as new species in 2015 by Didier Masson, Michel Benatti, and Emmanuël Sérusiaux. The species epithet, derived from the Latin Johannes, honours Australian lichenologist John Elix, "who was the first to suspect it was an undescribed taxon and for his generous help and support on many occasions".

Bulbothrix johannis is comparable to Bulbothrix pseudofungicola, but its  are wider, ranging from 0.4 to 2.0 mm as opposed to 0.4–1.1 mm.

References

Parmeliaceae
Lichen species
Lichens described in 2015
Lichens of Réunion
Taxa named by Emmanuël Sérusiaux